Marks may refer to:

Business 
 Mark's, a Canadian retail chain
 Marks & Spencer, a British retail chain
 Collective trade marks, trademarks owned by an organisation for the benefit of its members
 Marks & Co, the inspiration for the novel 84 Charing Cross Road

Places 
 Marks, Mississippi
 Marks station, an Amtrak train station in Marks, Mississippi
 Marks, Russia

Other uses 
 Marks (surname)
 Grade, a teacher's evaluation of a student's performance
 Marks (manor house), a manor house in London, England

See also 
 Mark (disambiguation)
 Marcks (disambiguation)
 Marx (disambiguation)